James Harvey Cummings (November 8, 1890 – November 1, 1979) was a Tennessee farmer, attorney and political figure.

Biography
Cummings was born in Cannon County, Tennessee, USA, east-southeast of Nashville. Other than during the course of his higher education he was a resident of that county throughout his life.

He was first elected to represent that area in the Tennessee House of Representatives in 1928 and served for ten consecutive terms. He was then elected Tennessee Secretary of State by his fellow legislators, serving from 1949 to 1953. He then returned to the legislature and served ten more consecutive terms prior to his retirement in 1972. During this time he became known as the "Dean of the Legislature" and also "The Last of the $4 a Day Men", in reference to his service at a time when Tennessee state legislators were allowed no salary at all and were paid only $4/day in expense money.

Cummings was very popular among his constituents and seldom faced any organized efforts to defeat him for reelection, and was honored by his peers during the last day of the 1972 session prior to his retirement. Later, the portion of State Route 53 between the Cannon County seat of Woodbury and Interstate 24 was named the Jim Cummings Highway in his honor. He is buried three miles outside of Woodbury.

Notes

1890 births
1979 deaths
People from Cannon County, Tennessee
Secretaries of State of Tennessee
Members of the Tennessee House of Representatives
20th-century American politicians